Norsk Polarinstitutt Glacier is a glacier flowing southwest between Mount Perov and Mount Limburg Stirum in the Belgica Mountains. Discovered by the Belgian Antarctic Expedition, 1957–58, under G. de Gerlache, who named it after the Norsk Polarinstitutt, which at the time was situated in Oslo but today has its headquarters in Tromsø (since 1998).

See also
 List of glaciers in the Antarctic
 Glaciology

References

Glaciers of Queen Maud Land
Princess Ragnhild Coast